The Second Time is a 1995 Italian drama film directed by Mimmo Calopresti. It was entered into the 1996 Cannes Film Festival.

Cast
 Francesca Antonelli as Antonella
 Valeria Bruni Tedeschi as Lisa Venturi
 Simona Caramelli as Sonia
 Marina Confalone as Adele
 Roberto De Francesco as Enrico
 Orsetta De Rossi as Raffaella
 Paolo De Vita as Judge Di Biagio
 Nello Mascia as Doctor
 Valeria Milillo as Francesca
 Nanni Moretti as Alberto Sajevo
 Rossana Mortara as Student
 Antonio Petrocelli as Ronchi

See also  
 List of Italian films of 1995

References

External links

1995 films
1990s Italian-language films
1995 drama films
Films directed by Mimmo Calopresti
Italian drama films
1990s Italian films